The Pyramid (1990)  (Romanized: Piramida) is a thriller novel by Soviet special investigator and deputy of Soviet Parliament Telman Gdlyan and professional writer Evgeny Dodolev, about Soviet Mafia. It is the first Soviet book about corruption. The book allegedly exposed ties between Leonid Brezhnev's family, Sharof Rashidov and the Soviet Mafia.

With their critical viewpoint of governmental corruption, co-authors were targeted by the government.

According to Edward Topol the already printed book was banned in 1989, then released a year and half later, one year before the dissolution of the Soviet Union.

Plot summary

The 260 pages of the book are divided into 27 chapters.

The first part describes the motives for the Soviet corruption.

The second part shows how Soviet Intelligence finds out about the so called Uzbek Affair.

To the common Russians, some names in this book became synonymous with corruption, nepotism and the Great Cotton Scandal of the late Brezhnev period.

Last, there are a few episodes from the life of Brezhnev's family (Galina Brezhneva and others).

Film adaptation
The Pyramid (Lenfilm, 1990)

See also
 Vitaly Korotich

References

External links
 About Telman Gdlyan
Brezhnev Rap by Notorische Reflexe, 1983
Our Course: Peace and Socialism Collection of Brezhnev's 1973 speeches
New Look Media

Russian novels adapted into films
1990 novels
1990 in the Soviet Union
Novels about the Russian Mafia
Novels about organized crime in Russia